Bowl Game (1974–2006) was an American Thoroughbred racehorse. He was bred in Kentucky by Greentree Stud and raced under the same Greentree Stable banner as his owner. He finished racing with a record of 11-6-5 in 23 starts with career earnings of US$907,083. Bowl Game Creek was best known for his wins in the grade one Washington, D.C. International Stakes, the grade one Man o' War Stakes and the grade two Dixie Handicap. In 1979 he became the only horse ever have won all four prestigious turf races of the United States. That same year he was named the country's top grass equine by being voted 1979 American Champion Male Turf Horse honors.

Early career 

Bowl Game was a very late developing thoroughbred. As a three-year-old Bowl Game only raced twice placing third in both races. He finished the year with an annual record of 0-0-2 in 2 starts for annual earning of $2,400.00

Four-year-old season 

In his four-year-old season Bowl Game raced a total of 10 races in a nine-month campaign that spanned from February through November 1978. In February he prepped in an allowance race and then stepped up to graded stakes action in March. In that race he won the Gulfstream Park Handicap at Gulfstream Park just outside Miami, Florida. In this race he won his only graded stakes race on the dirt in the Gulfstream Park Handicap, a grade one race under his regular jockey Jorge Velásquez. In April, he won the Pan American Handicap at Gulfstream Park. Later that year in May he won the Dixie Stakes at Pimlico Race Course in Baltimore, Maryland for his sixth straight win capturing one of the oldest trophies in American sports, the Annapolis Subscription Plate. That day he finished the oldest race in the Mid-Atlantic states at 1½ miles on soft turf in 2:33.40 over a field of nine stakes winners including Oilfield and Trumpeter Swan, who finished second and third respectively. He concluded the year with a spectacular record, finishing in-the-money in 100% of his races. In 1978 he ended with a record of 6 wins, 3 seconds and 1 third in 10 starts with annual earnings of $311,245.

Five-year-old season 

During his five-year-old season, he reeled off several grade one victories one after another. He won the prestigious Washington, D.C. International Stakes at Laurel Park Racecourse in a tepid 2:51 over a very soft turf course. In July, won two stakes races. First he won the Arlington Handicap in Chicago on the first weekend of July. Then Bowl Game wheeled back in three weeks and won the Man O' War Stakes at 1⅜ miles on the turf at Belmont Park in 2:19.0 even. He also won the Joe Hirsch Turf Classic Invitational Handicap at Aqueduct Racetrack in 2:28.20 at a mile and a half. He finished his five-year-old season with a record of 5 wins, 2 seconds and 2 thirds in 10 starts for annual earnings of $585,738. As a six-year-old he only raced once and placed second in an Allowance race at Belmont Park.

Retirement 

Bowl Game was euthanized November 10, 2006, due to old age: "He was out in the pasture and got two-thirds of the way up the hill and just lay down. He was in some distress, and it was clear to us that the time had come."

References

1974 racehorse births
2006 racehorse deaths
Thoroughbred family 26
Racehorses bred in Kentucky
Racehorses trained in the United States
Eclipse Award winners
Whitney racehorses